Fernand Courty (11 June 1862 – 12 October 1921) was a French astronomer and a discoverer of minor planets.

He joined Bordeaux Observatory when it was founded in 1880 by Georges Rayet and worked as an assistant astronomer. He is credited by the Minor Planet Center with the discovery of two asteroids at Bordeaux in 1894. He also made meteorological observations.

References

External links 
   Obituary

1862 births
1921 deaths
19th-century French astronomers
Discoverers of asteroids

20th-century French astronomers